The Department of Administrative Services was an Australian government department that existed between October 1975 and December 1975. It was the first so-named Commonwealth department, to be followed by three more.

Scope
Information about the department's functions and/or government funding allocation could be found in the Administrative Arrangements Orders, the annual Portfolio Budget Statements and in the Department's annual reports.

According to the Administrative Arrangements Order (AAO) made on 7 October 1975, the Department dealt with:
Elections and referendums 
Provision of accommodation, staff and other facilities for members of the Parliament other than in Parliament House 
Australian Government purchasing policy 
Procurement and purchase of goods and services, as required, for  Australian Government purposes 
Maintenance of stocks of any such goods 
Disposal of surplus goods 
Government transport and storage facilities in the States and storage and transport of goods in the Australian Capital Territory 
Advisory services on fire protection for Australian Government purposes in Australia

Structure
The Department was an Australian Public Service department, staffed by officials who were responsible to the Minister for Administrative Services.

References

Ministries established in 1975
Administrative Services
1975 establishments in Australia
1975 disestablishments in Australia